This is a list of Scottish football transfers for the 2007–08 season. Only moves featuring at least one 2007–08 Scottish Premier League club or one 2007–08 Scottish First Division club are listed.

The summer transfer window ran from the end of the 2006–07 season and closed on 31 August. The mid-season transfer window opened on 1 January 2008, and run for the entire month, until 31 January. Players without a club could join one, either during or in between transfer windows.

Two records were broken during the summer transfer window. Scott Brown's £4.4m transfer to Celtic from Hibernian was a record transfer between Scottish clubs, exceeding the £4m transfer of Duncan Ferguson from Dundee United to Rangers in 1993 – a then British record. Also Craig Gordon's move from Hearts to Sunderland made him the most expensive British goalkeeper.

Rangers spent the most money during the summer window, spending a total of £10.32m on fourteen players with Celtic spending £8.2m on six players. The only other significant transfer fees paid by a Scottish club was Hearts who paid FC Terek Grozny £500,000 for Laryea Kingston and the same amount to Sheffield United for Christian Nadé.

May 2007 – December 2007

January 2008 – April 2008

References

Scotland
Transfers
2007
Scotland